The 1970 NCAA University Division Wrestling Championships were the 40th NCAA University Division Wrestling Championships to be held. Northwestern University in Evanston, Illinois hosted the tournament at McGaw Memorial Hall.

Iowa State took home the team championship with 99 points and three individual champions. 

Larry Owings of Washington was named the Most Outstanding Wrestler and Dan Gable of Iowa State received the Gorriaran Award.

Team results

Individual finals

References
1970 NCAA Tournament Results

NCAA Division I Wrestling Championship
NCAA
Wrestling competitions in the United States
NCAA University Division Wrestling Championships
NCAA University Division Wrestling Championships
NCAA University Division Wrestling Championships